Third Person Singular Number is a 2009 Bangladeshi drama film directed by Mostofa Sarwar Farooki and written jointly by Mostofa Sarwar Farooki and Anisul Hoque. It stars actors Mosharraf Karim, Nusrat Imrose Tisha, Abul Hayat and musician Topu.

Plot 
The story is a portrait of a young women, Ruba, whose live-in boyfriend has been sent to jail. The movie follows her struggles navigating a conservative society after his arrest.

Cast
 Nusrat Imrose Tisha as Ruba
 Mosharraf Karim as Munna 
 Rashed Uddin Ahmed Topu as himself
 Abul Hayat
 Rocky Chowdury
 Shuveccha Haque
 Esha
 Aparna Ghosh
 Rani Sarker

Production 

The movie was inspired by the book, Tin Parber Jibon O Kichhu Bastab Case Study, by Syed Manzoorul Islam. The script was written jointly by Anisul Haque and Mostofa Sarwar Farooki. Nusrat Imrose Tisha made her debut in the movie. Arpana Gosh made her debut in the movie. Third Person Singular Number was produced by Impress Telefilms.

Release 
The film initially had trouble getting approval from Bangladesh Film Censor Board. It premiered in Star Cineplex, Dhaka on 10 December 2009. The film premiered at the Pusan International Film Festival 2009. It then went on to compete in Abu Dhabi Film Festival. Third Person Singular Number had its European premier at the Rotterdam IFF 2010. It traveled to festivals and received the best director award in Dhaka International Film Festival 2010. It was Bangladesh's official entry to the 83rd Oscar's foreign film category but didn't make the final shortlist.

Reception
Variety wrote that "Third Person Singular Number is a thoroughly modern, stylistically assured story of a young woman ... combining an indie sensibility with sub continental elements." Bangladeshi film critic Saif Samir criticized it and gave 2.5 out of 5 stars.

Topu received a Meril Prothom Alo award for his acting. The movie was awarded Best Film, Best Director for Farooki, Best actress in Meril Prothom Alo Awards 2010.

See also
 List of submissions to the 83rd Academy Awards for Best Foreign Language Film
 List of Bangladeshi submissions for the Academy Award for Best Foreign Language Film

References

External links

2009 films
2009 drama films
2000s Bengali-language films
Films scored by Habib Wahid
Bengali-language Bangladeshi films
Bangladeshi drama films
Films directed by Mostofa Sarwar Farooki
Best Film Meril-Prothom Alo Critics Award winners
Impress Telefilm films